The 1994–95 Campionato Nazionale Dilettanti was the forty-seventh edition of Serie D, at the time the fifth highest league in the Italian football league system.

A total of 162 teams contested the league, divided into nine groups (in Italian: Gironi) of 18 teams.

League tables

Girone A

Relegation play-off
Played on 20 May 1995 in Pinerolo.

Girone B

Girone C

Promotion play-off
Played on 21 May 1995 in Mantua.

Relegation play-off
Played on 20 May 1995 in Legnago.

Girone D

Relegation play-off
Played on 20 May 1995 in Mirano.

Girone E

Girone F

Relegation play-off
Played on 20 May 1995 in Teramo.

Girone G

Girone H

Girone I

Scudetto playoffs

Preliminary rounds

Group A

Group B

Group C

Group D

Final rounds

Semi-finals
First leg played on 8 June 1995 in Taranto; second leg played on 18 June 1995 in Viterbo

First leg played on 11 June 1995 in Tolentino; second leg played on 18 June 1995 in Gallarate

Finals
First leg played on 22 June 1995 in Taranto; second leg played on 25 June 1995 in Tolentino

References

External links
 1994–95 Campionato Nazionale Dilettanti at CalcioDiEccellenza.it
1994–95 Campionato Nazionale Dilettanti at RSSSF.com

Serie D seasons
Italy
5